Melissa Melero-Moose is a Northern Paiute/Modoc mixed-media artist and co-founder of Great Basin Native Artists, a collective based in Nevada. She is enrolled in the Paiute-Shoshone Tribe of the Fallon Reservation and Colony.

Early life and education 
Melissa Melero-Moose was born in San Francisco, California, in 1974.

Art career 
Melero-Moose developed a style of abstract, mixed-media paintings that reference the landscape and culture of her Northern Paiute people. She painted with acrylic washes with layers rice paper and natural objects, such as willow, tule, cattails, and pine nuts. Great Basin landscape, petroglyphs, and basketry inspired her work.

She specializes in visual mixed-media art and has had her work displayed through the Nevada Arts Council.

She has frequently exhibited at the Santa Fe Indian Market and Heard Museum Guild Fair & Market in Phoenix, Arizona.

Great Basin advocacy 
To address the invisibility of Indigenous peoples of the Great Basin in the Native American art world, Melero-Moose co-founded the Great Basin Native Artists (GBNA) collective in 2014. She has curated numerous group exhibitions of Great Basin artists, including Great Basin Native Artists (2016) at the Carson City Community Center. The Great Basin Native Arts has partnered with Stewart Indian School Cultural Center and Museum to maintain a changing art gallery featuring regional Indigenous artists.

"Indian people, even though so much of the population was wiped out, we never stopped creating,” said Melero-Moose.

Beginning in 2018, the Nevada Museum of Art gave Melero-Moose a fellowship to research and create a directory and archive of Great Basin Native artists.

Melero-Moose serves on the board of the Nevada Arts Council.

Selected exhibitions 
 2019: Stories from the Land: Indigenous Voices Connecting within the Great Plains, Birger Sandzén Memorial Gallery, Lindsborg, KS
 2017–18: Connective Tissue: New Approaches to Fiber in Contemporary Native Art, IAIA Museum of Contemporary Native Arts, Santa Fe
 2017: Great Basin Artists: Melissa Melero-Moose, Topaz Jones, Karma Henry & Jaune Quick-to-See Smith, CN Gorman Museum, Davis, CA

Awards and honors 
Besides winning several awards at Santa Fe Indian Market, Melero-Moose was selected by SWAIA as its Santa Fe Indian Market Discovery Fellow in 2016.

In 2015, the School for Advanced Research chose Melero-Moose as its Ronald and Susan Dubin fellow.

The Nevada Museum of Art in Reno named her the inaugural Peter E. Pool Research Fellow in 2018.

References

External links
 Artist website
 Melissa Melero-Moose, Great Basin Native Artists
 Melissa Melero-Moose, Joan Mitchell Foundation

Living people
1974 births
Northern Paiute people
People from Sparks, Nevada
Portland State University alumni
Institute of American Indian Arts alumni
Artists from San Francisco
Painters from California
21st-century Native American women
21st-century Native Americans
21st-century American women artists
21st-century American painters
American women painters
Mixed-media artists
20th-century Native Americans
20th-century Native American women